Lepke is a 1975 film starring Tony Curtis as the Jewish-American gangster Louis "Lepke" Buchalter. It is often regarded by film critics as one of Tony Curtis's most underrated movies and one of his finest performances

Cast
 Tony Curtis as Louis "Lepke" Buchalter 
 Anjanette Comer as Bernice Meyer 
 Michael Callan as Robert Kane 
 Warren Berlinger as Jacob "Gurrah" Shapiro 
 Gianni Russo as Albert "Lord High Executioner" Anastasia
 Milton Berle as Mr. Meyer
 Vic Tayback as Charlie "Lucky" Luciano
 Mary Charlotte Wilcox as Marion

Production
Menahem Golan had been a successful filmmaker in Israel and had ambitions to break into Hollywood. Lepke was to be the first of four films he intended to make there. Golan said he chose Lepke as a subject because he grew up on American gangster films of Bogart and Cagney. "I was afraid to touch a contemporary American subject and be disgraced like Miloš Forman and Antonioni," he said in a 1974 interview. "If you go back to the old then at least you and the young people are starting on the same foot. And besides, Lepke was a Jewish gangster rather than an Italian."

It was Curtis' first feature in a number of years - he had been working in TV and on the stage. Filming took place at Culver City studios.

In his 2008 autobiography American Prince Curtis admitted becoming heavily addicted to cocaine during filming; this addiction would last for a decade and significantly derailed his already troubled film career. His mother died during filming.

Release
The film was sold to Warner Bros for $1.75 million.

References

Notes

External links
 

1975 films
1970s crime drama films
Films about Jewish-American organized crime
Biographical films about gangsters
Films set in the 1920s
Films set in the 1930s
Films set in the 1940s
Cultural depictions of Louis Buchalter
Cultural depictions of Albert Anastasia
Cultural depictions of Lucky Luciano
Films directed by Menahem Golan
1975 drama films
Films produced by Menahem Golan
Films produced by Yoram Globus
1970s English-language films
American biographical drama films
American crime drama films
American gangster films
American films based on actual events
1970s American films